Claude Delisle (1644–1720; the name also appears as de l'Isle) was a French Geographer, cartographer and historian.

Biography 
Born in Vaucouleurs. on november 5 1644 from a physician father, he studied law at Pont-à-Mousson, became a lawyer before settling in Paris in 1674 and becoming a geography and history professor, later obtaining the post of Royal Censor. One of his students was Henri François d'Aguesseau, future Chancellor of France

His main work was a universal history in 7 volumes published posthumously in 1731. He also authored a historical description of Siam

References 

1644 births
1720 deaths
17th-century French cartographers
17th-century French historians